Cai Qing is a fictional character in Water Margin, one of the Four Great Classical Novels in Chinese literature. Nicknamed "Stalk of Flower", he ranks 95th among the 108 Stars of Destiny and 59th among the 72 Earthly Fiends.

Background
Living in Daming Prefecture (大名府; present-day Daming County, Hebei) with his elder brother Cai Fu, Cai Qing is a jailer in the city's prison who also assists his sibling in the execution of prisoners. Cai Qing, who has large eyes and thick eyebrows, is nicknamed "Stalk of Flower" because he likes to stick a flower in his hat.

Joining Liangshan
Lu Junyi, a squire of Daming, is arrested and jailed after his housekeeper Li Gu, who is having an affair with Lu's wife, reports him to the authorities that he has ties with the bandits of Liangshan. Lu has earlier been lured to Liangshan, which failed to persuade him to join them.

Li Gu bribes Cai Fu, the warden in charge of Lu Junyi in prison, to murder the squire. However, Liangshan's Chai Jin also visits Cai Fu and offers him an even larger sum of money to ensure Lu is safe. Not wanting to antagonise either, Cao Fu is in a bind. Cai Qing advises him to bribe officials to exile Lu to a faraway place, thereby washing his hands of the case.

However, Li Gu bribes the guards escorting Lu Junyi to Shamen Island (沙門島; present-day Changdao County, Shandong) to murder him along the way. Lu's servant Yan Qing kills the escorts when they are about to finish him off in a wood. But Lu, who is weak from days of torture, is captured again at an inn when Yan goes look for food. This time, he is immediately sentenced to death. Just when Cai Fu is about to swing his sabre to chop off Lu's head at a public execution ground, the brothers are gladly stunned by Shi Xiu of Liangshan, who storms towards them in a lone attempt to save the squire. The Cai brothers, who do not want to be in the black book of Liangshan, subtly loosen the ropes on Lu and allow Shi Xiu to drag him away. But the two are overwhelmed by the soldiers and captured. Grand Secretary Liang Shijie, the governor of Daming, decides to keep them alive as bargaining chips should Liangshan mount an attack. The Cai brothers take good care of Lu and Shi in prison.

Liangshan could not break into Daming despite winning a few military battles. After a short respite that caused Daming to become less vigilant, Wu Yong sends a number of chieftains to infiltrate Daming on the night of the Lantern Festival. When they unleash havoc in the city cued by a fire set by Shi Qian, Chai Jin visits the prison to coerce the Cai brothers to free Lu Junyi and Shi Xiu. Knowing they have no choice, the Cais release the two prisoners and follow the outlaws back to Liangshan.

Campaigns and death
Cai Qing is appointed to help his brother in executions after the 108 Stars of Destiny came together in what is called the Grand Assembly. He participates in the campaigns against the Liao invaders and rebel forces in Song territory following amnesty from Emperor Huizong for Liangshan.

Cai Qing is one of the Liangshan heroes who survive all the campaigns. He is conferred the title "Martial Gentleman of Grace" and appointed to a position in Daming, where Guan Sheng also holds a post.

References
 
 
 
 
 
 
 

72 Earthly Fiends
Fictional executioners
Fictional prison officers and governors
Fictional characters from Hebei